The 2005 Great Alaska Shootout was held November 23, 2005, through November 26, 2005 at Sullivan Arena in Anchorage, Alaska

Brackets 
* – Denotes overtime period

Men's

Women's

References

Great Alaska Shootout
Great Alaska Shootout
Great Alaska Shootout
Great Alaska Shootout
Great Alaska Shootout